The Armenian National Constitution ( Hay azkayin sahmanatroutioun) or Regulation of the Armenian Nation was the 1863 Ottoman Empire-approved form of the "Code of Regulations" composed of 150 articles which define the powers of Patriarch (position in Ottoman Millet) and newly formed "Armenian National Assembly". This code is still active among Armenian Church in diaspora. The Ottoman Turkish version was published in the Düstur.

The document itself was called a "constitution" in Armenian, while the Ottoman Turkish version was instead called a "regulation" on the millet.

History
Hatt-ı Hümayun's (1856) organisation to bring equality among millets also brought the discontent of the Armenian Patriarchate. Before the Hatt-ı Hümayun, the Armenian Patriarch was not only the spiritual leader of the community, but its secular leader (of all Armenians - the Armenian nation) as well. The Patriarch could at will dismiss the Bishops and his jurisdiction extended to 50 areas. The  revolutionary Armenians wanted to abolish what they saw as oppression by the nobility, drawing up a new `National Regulation'. The "Code of Regulations" (1860) was drafted by members of the Armenian intelligentsia (Dr. Nahabet Rusinian, Dr. Servichen, Nigoghos Balian, Krikor Odian and Krikor Margosian). They primarily sought to define the powers of Patriarch. 

Finally the Council accepted the draft regulation on May 24, 1860, and presented it to the Sublime Porte (Bâb-ı Âli). The government of Sultan Abdülaziz ratified it (with some minor changes) by a firman on March 17, 1863, and made it effective. The Armenian National Constitution (Ottoman Turkish:"Nizâmnâme-i Millet-i Ermeniyân") was Ottoman Empire approved form of the "Code of Regulations" composed of 150 articles  which defined the powers of Patriarch (his position in Ottoman Millet) and newly formed "Armenian National Assembly".

The Armenian Patriarch began to share his powers with the Armenian National Assembly and limited by the Armenian National Constitution. He perceived the changes as erosion of his community.

It defined the condition of Armenians within the state, but also it had regulations defining the authority of the Patriarch.  The constitution of Armenian National Assembly seen as a milestone by progressive Armenians. It attempted to define Armenia as a modern nation. The reforms which resulted in the Armenian National Assembly came about as individual Armenians and pressure group complained frequently for assistance against injustices perpetuated by the Kurds (seen as feudal) and corrupt officialdom. At the beginning the relations were positive but in the 1860s, the Ottomans, having crushed Kurdish resistance, no longer needed Armenian support, and the Empire became less responsive to Armenian claims.

Henry Finnis Blosse Lynch, author of Armenia, Travels and Studies, wrote in the second volume, published in 1901, that the Armenian National Constitution was "practically in abeyance owing to the strained relations at present existing between the Palace and the Armenians."

References
  (PDF p. 573-595/644)

Notes

Further reading
Copies of the Armenian constitution:
 
 Dustur, Constantinople (Istanbul), 1289, II, pp. 938-961. - Ottoman Turkish version
  - Copies of the Ottoman constitution in Armenian and Armeno-Turkish are in the appendix
  (PDF p. 573-595/644) - English translation of the Armenian constitution
  - French translation

External links

 

Ottoman period in Armenia
Armenians from the Ottoman Empire
Ottoman law
Law of Armenia
Reform in the Ottoman Empire